Dikyamaç Village Lifestyle Museum, shortly Dikyamaç Museum,  is an ethnography museum in Artvin Province, northeastern Turkey.

When established, the private museum was unique in Artvin Province as being the only museum of the province.

The museum was established by the businessman Naim Özkazanç and  Professor Maksut Coşkun in 2012. The exhibited items are former and current house tools and clothes.

References

Ethnographic museums in Turkey
Buildings and structures in Artvin Province
Museums established in 2012
2012 establishments in Turkey
Arhavi District